

Peerage of England, Scotland and Great Britain

Dukes

|colspan=5 style="background: #fcc" align="center"|Peerage of England
|-
|Duke of Cornwall (1337)||Frederick, Prince of Wales||1727||1751||
|-
|Duke of Norfolk (1483)||Edward Howard, 9th Duke of Norfolk||1732||1777||
|-
|rowspan=2|Duke of Somerset (1547)||Charles Seymour, 6th Duke of Somerset||1678||1748||Died
|-
|Algernon Seymour, 7th Duke of Somerset||1748||1750||
|-
|Duke of Cleveland (1670)||William FitzRoy, 3rd Duke of Cleveland||1730||1774||
|-
|Duke of Richmond (1675)||Charles Lennox, 2nd Duke of Richmond||1723||1750||
|-
|Duke of Grafton (1675)||Charles FitzRoy, 2nd Duke of Grafton||1690||1757||
|-
|rowspan=2|Duke of Beaufort (1682)||Henry Scudamore, 3rd Duke of Beaufort||1714||1745||Died
|-
|Charles Somerset, 4th Duke of Beaufort||1745||1756||
|-
|Duke of St Albans (1684)||Charles Beauclerk, 2nd Duke of St Albans||1726||1751||
|-
|Duke of Bolton (1689)||Charles Powlett, 3rd Duke of Bolton||1722||1754||
|-
|Duke of Leeds (1694)||Thomas Osborne, 4th Duke of Leeds||1731||1789||
|-
|Duke of Bedford (1694)||John Russell, 4th Duke of Bedford||1732||1771||
|-
|Duke of Devonshire (1694)||William Cavendish, 3rd Duke of Devonshire||1729||1755||
|-
|Duke of Marlborough (1702)||Charles Spencer, 3rd Duke of Marlborough||1733||1758||
|-
|Duke of Rutland (1703)||John Manners, 3rd Duke of Rutland||1721||1779||
|-
|Duke of Montagu (1705)||John Montagu, 2nd Duke of Montagu||1709||1749||Died, title extinct
|-
|colspan=5 style="background: #fcc" align="center"|Peerage of Scotland
|-
|rowspan=2|Duke of Hamilton (1643)||James Hamilton, 5th Duke of Hamilton||1712||1743||Died
|-
|James Hamilton, 6th Duke of Hamilton||1743||1758||
|-
|Duke of Buccleuch (1663)||Francis Scott, 2nd Duke of Buccleuch||1732||1751||
|-
|Duke of Queensberry (1684)||Charles Douglas, 3rd Duke of Queensberry||1711||1778||
|-
|Duke of Gordon (1684)||Cosmo Gordon, 3rd Duke of Gordon||1728||1752||
|-
|rowspan=2|Duke of Argyll (1701)||John Campbell, 2nd Duke of Argyll||1703||1743||Died
|-
|Archibald Campbell, 3rd Duke of Argyll||1743||1761||
|-
|Duke of Atholl (1703)||James Murray, 2nd Duke of Atholl||1724||1764||
|-
|Duke of Douglas (1703)||Archibald Douglas, 1st Duke of Douglas||1703||1761||
|-
|rowspan=2|Duke of Montrose (1707)||James Graham, 1st Duke of Montrose||1707||1742||Died
|-
|William Graham, 2nd Duke of Montrose||1742||1790||
|-
|rowspan=2|Duke of Roxburghe (1707)||John Ker, 1st Duke of Roxburghe||1707||1741||Died
|-
|Robert Ker, 2nd Duke of Roxburghe||1741||1755||
|-
|colspan=5 style="background: #fcc" align="center"|Peerage of Great Britain
|-
|Duke of Kent (1710)||Henry Grey, 1st Duke of Kent||1710||1740||Died, title extinct
|-
|rowspan=2|Duke of Ancaster and Kesteven (1715)||Peregrine Bertie, 2nd Duke of Ancaster and Kesteven||1723||1742||Died
|-
|Peregrine Bertie, 3rd Duke of Ancaster and Kesteven||1742||1778||
|-
|Duke of Kingston-upon-Hull (1715)||Evelyn Pierrepont, 2nd Duke of Kingston-upon-Hull||1726||1773||
|-
|Duke of Newcastle (1715)||Thomas Pelham-Holles, 1st Duke of Newcastle||1715||1768||
|-
|Duke of Portland (1716)||William Bentinck, 2nd Duke of Portland||1726||1762||
|-
|Duchess of Kendal (1719)||Melusine von der Schulenburg, Duchess of Kendal||1719||1743||Died, title extinct
|-
|Duke of Manchester (1719)||Robert Montagu, 3rd Duke of Manchester||1739||1762||
|-
|rowspan=2|Duke of Chandos (1719)||James Brydges, 1st Duke of Chandos||1719||1744||Died
|-
|Henry Brydges, 2nd Duke of Chandos||1744||1771||
|-
|Duke of Dorset (1720)||Lionel Sackville, 1st Duke of Dorset||1720||1765||
|-
|rowspan=3|Duke of Bridgewater (1720)||Scroop Egerton, 1st Duke of Bridgewater||1720||1745||Died
|-
|John Egerton, 2nd Duke of Bridgewater||1745||1748||Died
|-
|Francis Egerton, 3rd Duke of Bridgewater||1748||1803||
|-
|Duke of Cumberland (1726)||Prince William, Duke of Cumberland||1726||1765||
|-
|}

Marquesses

|colspan=5 style="background: #fcc" align="center"|Peerage of England
|-
|rowspan=2|Marquess of Powis (1687)||William Herbert, 2nd Marquess of Powis||1696||1745||Died
|-
|William Herbert, 3rd Marquess of Powis||1745||1748||Died, title extinct
|-
|colspan=5 style="background: #fcc" align="center"|Peerage of Scotland
|-
|Marquess of Tweeddale (1694)||John Hay, 4th Marquess of Tweeddale||1715||1762||
|-
|Marquess of Lothian (1701)||William Kerr, 3rd Marquess of Lothian||1722||1767||
|-
|Marquess of Annandale (1701)||George Vanden-Bempde, 3rd Marquess of Annandale||1730||1792||
|-
|colspan=5 style="background: #fcc" align="center"|Peerage of Great Britain
|-
|Marquess Grey (1740)||Jemima Yorke, 2nd Marchioness Grey||1740||1797||Title previously held by the Duke of Kent
|-
|Marquess of Rockingham (1746)||Thomas Watson-Wentworth, 1st Marquess of Rockingham||1746||1750||New creation
|-
|}

Earls

|colspan=5 style="background: #fcc" align="center"|Peerage of England
|-
|rowspan=2|Earl of Shrewsbury (1442)||Gilbert Talbot, 13th Earl of Shrewsbury||1718||1743||Died
|-
|George Talbot, 14th Earl of Shrewsbury||1743||1787||
|-
|Earl of Derby (1485)||Edward Stanley, 11th Earl of Derby||1736||1776||
|-
|rowspan=2|Earl of Huntingdon (1529)||Theophilus Hastings, 9th Earl of Huntingdon||1705||1746||Died
|-
|Francis Hastings, 10th Earl of Huntingdon||1746||1789||
|-
|rowspan=2|Earl of Pembroke (1551)||Henry Herbert, 9th Earl of Pembroke||1733||1749||Died
|-
|Henry Herbert, 10th Earl of Pembroke||1749||1794||
|-
|Earl of Devon (1553)||William Courtenay, de jure 7th Earl of Devon||1735||1762||
|-
|Earl of Lincoln (1572)||Henry Clinton, 9th Earl of Lincoln||1730||1794||
|-
|rowspan=2|Earl of Suffolk (1603)||Henry Howard, 10th Earl of Suffolk||1733||1745||Died
|-
|Henry Howard, 11th Earl of Suffolk||1745||1757||
|-
|Earl of Exeter (1605)||Brownlow Cecil, 8th Earl of Exeter||1722||1754||
|-
|Earl of Salisbury (1605)||James Cecil, 6th Earl of Salisbury||1728||1780||
|-
|Earl of Northampton (1618)||James Compton, 5th Earl of Northampton||1727||1754||
|-
|Earl of Leicester (1618)||Jocelyn Sidney, 7th Earl of Leicester||1737||1743||Died, title extinct
|-
|Earl of Warwick (1618)||Edward Rich, 8th Earl of Warwick||1721||1759||
|-
|Earl of Denbigh (1622)||William Feilding, 5th Earl of Denbigh||1717||1755||
|-
|Earl of Westmorland (1624)||John Fane, 7th Earl of Westmorland||1736||1762||
|-
|Earl of Berkshire (1626)||Henry Howard, 4th Earl of Berkshire||1706||1757||Succeeded to the more senior Earldom of Suffolk, see above
|-
|Earl of Peterborough (1628)||Charles Mordaunt, 4th Earl of Peterborough||1735||1779||
|-
|Earl of Stamford (1628)||Harry Grey, 4th Earl of Stamford||1739||1768||
|-
|Earl of Winchilsea (1628)||Daniel Finch, 8th Earl of Winchilsea||1730||1769||
|-
|Earl of Chesterfield (1628)||Philip Stanhope, 4th Earl of Chesterfield||1726||1773||
|-
|Earl of Thanet (1628)||Sackville Tufton, 7th Earl of Thanet||1729||1753||
|-
|Earl of Sandwich (1660)||John Montagu, 4th Earl of Sandwich||1729||1792||
|-
|Earl of Anglesey (1661)||Richard Annesley, 6th Earl of Anglesey||1737||1761||
|-
|Earl of Cardigan (1661)||George Brudenell, 4th Earl of Cardigan||1732||1790||
|-
|Earl of Clarendon (1661)||Henry Hyde, 4th Earl of Clarendon||1723||1753||
|-
|rowspan="2"|Earl of Essex (1661)||William Capell, 3rd Earl of Essex||1710||1743||Died
|-
|William Capell, 4th Earl of Essex||1743||1799||
|-
|Earl of Carlisle (1661)||Henry Howard, 4th Earl of Carlisle||1738||1758||
|-
|rowspan="2"|Earl of Ailesbury (1664)||Thomas Bruce, 2nd Earl of Ailesbury||1685||1741||Died
|-
|Charles Bruce, 3rd Earl of Ailesbury||1741||1747||Died, title extinct; Earldom of Elgin succeeded by a cousin
|-
|Earl of Burlington (1664)||Richard Boyle, 3rd Earl of Burlington||1704||1753||Earl of Cork in the Peerage of Ireland
|-
|Earl of Shaftesbury (1672)||Anthony Ashley Cooper, 4th Earl of Shaftesbury||1713||1771||
|-
|rowspan="2"|Earl of Lichfield (1674)||George Lee, 2nd Earl of Lichfield||1716||1742||Died
|-
|George Lee, 3rd Earl of Lichfield||1742||1772||
|-
|rowspan="2"|Earl of Radnor (1679)||Henry Robartes, 3rd Earl of Radnor||1723||1741||Died
|-
|John Robartes, 4th Earl of Radnor||1741||1757||
|-
|Earl of Berkeley (1679)||Augustus Berkeley, 4th Earl of Berkeley||1736||1755||
|-
|rowspan="2"|Earl of Abingdon (1682)||Montagu Venables-Bertie, 2nd Earl of Abingdon||1699||1743||Died
|-
|Willoughby Bertie, 3rd Earl of Abingdon||1743||1760||
|-
|Earl of Gainsborough (1682)||Baptist Noel, 4th Earl of Gainsborough||1714||1751||
|-
|Earl of Plymouth (1682)||Other Windsor, 4th Earl of Plymouth||1732||1771||
|-
|Earl of Holderness (1682)||Robert Darcy, 4th Earl of Holderness||1722||1778||
|-
|Earl of Stafford (1688)||William Stafford-Howard, 3rd Earl of Stafford||1734||1751||
|-
|Earl of Warrington (1690)||George Booth, 2nd Earl of Warrington||1694||1758||
|-
|Earl of Scarbrough (1690)||Thomas Lumley-Saunderson, 3rd Earl of Scarbrough||1739||1752||
|-
|Earl of Bradford (1694)||Thomas Newport, 4th Earl of Bradford||1734||1762||
|-
|Earl of Rochford (1695)||William Nassau de Zuylestein, 4th Earl of Rochford||1738||1781||
|-
|Earl of Albemarle (1697)||Willem van Keppel, 2nd Earl of Albemarle||1718||1754||
|-
|Earl of Coventry (1697)||William Coventry, 5th Earl of Coventry||1719||1751||
|-
|Earl of Jersey (1697)||William Villiers, 3rd Earl of Jersey||1721||1769||
|-
|Earl of Grantham (1698)||Henry de Nassau d'Auverquerque, 1st Earl of Grantham||1698||1754||
|-
|rowspan="2"|Earl Poulett (1706)||John Poulett, 1st Earl Poulett||1706||1743||Died
|-
|John Poulett, 2nd Earl Poulett||1743||1764||
|-
|Earl of Godolphin (1706)||Francis Godolphin, 2nd Earl of Godolphin||1712||1766||
|-
|Earl of Cholmondeley (1706)||George Cholmondeley, 3rd Earl of Cholmondeley||1733||1770||
|-
|colspan=5 style="background: #fcc" align="center"|Peerage of Scotland
|-
|rowspan=2|Earl of Crawford (1398)||John Lindsay, 20th Earl of Crawford||1713||1749||Died
|-
|George Lindsay-Crawford, 21st Earl of Crawford||1749||1781||
|-
|Earl of Erroll (1452)||Mary Hay, 14th Countess of Erroll||1717||1758||
|-
|Earl of Sutherland (1235)||William Sutherland, 17th Earl of Sutherland||1733||1750||
|-
|Earl of Rothes (1458)||John Leslie, 10th Earl of Rothes||1722||1767||
|-
|Earl of Morton (1458)||James Douglas, 14th Earl of Morton||1738||1768||
|-
|Earl of Glencairn (1488)||William Cunningham, 13th Earl of Glencairn||1734||1775||
|-
|Earl of Eglinton (1507)||Alexander Montgomerie, 10th Earl of Eglinton||1729||1769||
|-
|Earl of Cassilis (1509)||John Kennedy, 8th Earl of Cassilis||1701||1759||
|-
|Earl of Caithness (1455)||Alexander Sinclair, 9th Earl of Caithness||1705||1765||
|-
|rowspan=2|Earl of Buchan (1469)||David Erskine, 9th Earl of Buchan||1695||1745||Died
|-
|Henry Erskine, 10th Earl of Buchan||1745||1767||
|-
|Earl of Moray (1562)||James Stuart, 8th Earl of Moray||1739||1767||
|-
|Earl of Home (1605)||William Home, 8th Earl of Home||1720||1761||
|-
|rowspan=2|Earl of Wigtown (1606)||John Fleming, 6th Earl of Wigtown||1681||1744||Died
|-
|Charles Fleming, 7th Earl of Wigtown||1744||1747||Died, title extinct
|-
|rowspan=2|Earl of Abercorn (1606)||James Hamilton, 7th Earl of Abercorn||1734||1744||Died
|-
|James Hamilton, 8th Earl of Abercorn||1744||1789||
|-
|Earl of Strathmore and Kinghorne (1606)||Thomas Lyon, 8th Earl of Strathmore and Kinghorne||1735||1753||
|-
|Earl of Kellie (1619)||Alexander Erskine, 5th Earl of Kellie||1710||1758||
|-
|Earl of Haddington (1619)||Thomas Hamilton, 7th Earl of Haddington||1735||1794||
|-
|rowspan=2|Earl of Galloway (1623)||James Stewart, 5th Earl of Galloway||1694||1746||Died
|-
|Alexander Stewart, 6th Earl of Galloway||1746||1773||
|-
|rowspan=2|Earl of Lauderdale (1624)||Charles Maitland, 6th Earl of Lauderdale||1710||1744||Died
|-
|James Maitland, 7th Earl of Lauderdale||1744||1789||
|-
|Earl of Loudoun (1633)||John Campbell, 4th Earl of Loudoun||1731||1782||
|-
|Earl of Kinnoull (1633)||George Hay, 8th Earl of Kinnoull||1709||1758||
|-
|rowspan=2|Earl of Dumfries (1633)||Penelope Crichton, 4th Countess of Dumfries||1694||1742||Died
|-
|William Dalrymple-Crichton, 5th Earl of Dumfries||1742||1769||
|-
|Earl of Elgin (1633)||Charles Bruce, 5th Earl of Elgin||1747||1771||Title previously held by the Earl of Ailesbury
|-
|rowspan=2|Earl of Traquair (1633)||Charles Stewart, 4th Earl of Traquair||1673||1741||Died
|-
|Charles Stewart, 5th Earl of Traquair||1741||1764||
|-
|Earl of Wemyss (1633)||James Wemyss, 5th Earl of Wemyss||1720||1756||
|-
|Earl of Dalhousie (1633)||Charles Ramsay, 7th Earl of Dalhousie||1739||1764||
|-
|Earl of Findlater (1638)||James Ogilvy, 5th Earl of Findlater||1730||1764||
|-
|Earl of Leven (1641)||Alexander Leslie, 5th Earl of Leven||1728||1754||
|-
|Earl of Dysart (1643)||Lionel Tollemache, 4th Earl of Dysart||1727||1770||
|-
|rowspan=2|Earl of Selkirk (1646)||John Hamilton, 3rd Earl of Selkirk||1739||1744||Died
|-
|Dunbar Douglas, 4th Earl of Selkirk||1744||1799||
|-
|rowspan=2|Earl of Northesk (1647)||David Carnegie, 5th Earl of Northesk||1729||1741||Died
|-
|George Carnegie, 6th Earl of Northesk||1741||1792||
|-
|rowspan=3|Earl of Kincardine (1647)||Thomas Bruce, 7th Earl of Kincardine||1721||1740||Died
|-
|William Bruce, 8th Earl of Kincardine||1740||1740||
|-
|Charles Bruce, 9th Earl of Kincardine||1740||1771||Succeeded to the more senior Earldom of Elgin, see above
|-
|Earl of Balcarres (1651)||James Lindsay, 5th Earl of Balcarres||1736||1768||
|-
|Earl of Aboyne (1660)||Charles Gordon, 4th Earl of Aboyne||1732||1794||
|-
|Earl of Newburgh (1660)||Charles Livingston, 2nd Earl of Newburgh||1670||1755||
|-
|Earl of Kilmarnock (1661)||William Boyd, 4th Earl of Kilmarnock||1717||1746||Attainted
|-
|Earl of Dundonald (1669)||William Cochrane, 7th Earl of Dundonald||1737||1758||
|-
|Earl of Dumbarton (1675)||George Douglas, 2nd Earl of Dumbarton||1692||1749||Died, peerage extinct
|-
|Earl of Kintore (1677)||John Keith, 3rd Earl of Kintore||1718||1758||
|-
|Earl of Breadalbane and Holland (1677)||John Campbell, 2nd Earl of Breadalbane and Holland||1717||1752||
|-
|rowspan=2|Earl of Aberdeen (1682)||William Gordon, 2nd Earl of Aberdeen||1720||1746||Died
|-
|George Gordon, 3rd Earl of Aberdeen||1746||1801||
|-
|Earl of Dunmore (1686)||John Murray, 2nd Earl of Dunmore||1710||1752||
|-
|Earl of Orkney (1696)||Anne O'Brien, 2nd Countess of Orkney||1737||1756||
|-
|Earl of Ruglen (1697)||Anne Hamilton, 2nd Countess of Ruglen||1744||1748||Title previously held by the Earl of Selkirk; died, title succeeded by the Earl of March
|-
|Earl of March (1697)||William Douglas, 3rd Earl of March||1731||1810||
|-
|rowspan=2|Earl of Marchmont (1697)||Alexander Hume-Campbell, 2nd Earl of Marchmont||1724||1740||Died
|-
|Hugh Hume-Campbell, 3rd Earl of Marchmont||1740||1794||
|-
|Earl of Hyndford (1701)||John Carmichael, 3rd Earl of Hyndford||1737||1766||
|-
|Earl of Cromartie (1703)||George Mackenzie, 3rd Earl of Cromartie||1731||1746||Attainted
|-
|rowspan=2|Earl of Stair (1703)||John Dalrymple, 2nd Earl of Stair||1707||1747||Died
|-
|James Dalrymple, 3rd Earl of Stair||1747||1760||
|-
|Earl of Rosebery (1703)||James Primrose, 2nd Earl of Rosebery||1723||1765||
|-
|rowspan=2|Earl of Glasgow (1703)||John Boyle, 2nd Earl of Glasgow||1733||1740||Died
|-
|John Boyle, 3rd Earl of Glasgow||1740||1775||
|-
|Earl of Portmore (1703)||Charles Colyear, 2nd Earl of Portmore||1730||1785||
|-
|Earl of Bute (1703)||John Stuart, 3rd Earl of Bute||1723||1792||
|-
|rowspan=2|Earl of Hopetoun (1703)||Charles Hope, 1st Earl of Hopetoun||1703||1742||Died
|-
|John Hope, 2nd Earl of Hopetoun||1742||1781||
|-
|rowspan=2|Earl of Deloraine (1706)||Henry Scott, 3rd Earl of Deloraine||1739||1740||Died
|-
|Henry Scott, 4th Earl of Deloraine||1740||1807||
|-
|Earl of Ilay (1706)||Archibald Campbell, 1st Earl of Ilay||1706||1761||Succeeded to the Dukedom of Argyll, see above
|-
|colspan=5 style="background: #fcc" align="center"|Peerage of Great Britain
|-
|rowspan=2|Earl of Oxford and Mortimer (1711)||Edward Harley, 2nd Earl of Oxford and Earl Mortimer||1724||1741||Died
|-
|Edward Harley, 3rd Earl of Oxford and Earl Mortimer||1741||1755||
|-
|Earl of Strafford (1711)||William Wentworth, 2nd Earl of Strafford||1739||1791||
|-
|rowspan=2|Earl Ferrers (1711)||Henry Shirley, 3rd Earl Ferrers||1729||1745||Died
|-
|Laurence Shirley, 4th Earl Ferrers||1745||1760||
|-
|Earl of Dartmouth (1711)||William Legge, 1st Earl of Dartmouth||1711||1750||
|-
|Earl of Tankerville (1714)||Charles Bennet, 2nd Earl of Tankerville||1722||1753||
|-
|Earl of Aylesford (1714)||Heneage Finch, 2nd Earl of Aylesford||1740||1757||
|-
|Earl of Bristol (1714)||John Hervey, 1st Earl of Bristol||1714||1751||
|-
|rowspan=2|Earl of Rockingham (1714)||Lewis Watson, 2nd Earl of Rockingham||1724||1745||Died
|-
|Thomas Watson, 3rd Earl of Rockingham||1745||1746||Died; Peerage extinct
|-
|rowspan=2|Earl of Uxbridge (1714)||Henry Paget, 1st Earl of Uxbridge||1714||1743||Died
|-
|Henry Paget, 2nd Earl of Uxbridge||1743||1769||
|-
|rowspan=2|Earl Granville (1715)||Grace Carteret, 1st Countess Granville||1715||1744||Died
|-
|John Carteret, 2nd Earl Granville||1744||1763||
|-
|Earl of Halifax (1715)||George Montagu-Dunk, 2nd Earl of Halifax||1739||1771||
|-
|Earl of Sussex (1717)||George Yelverton, 2nd Earl of Sussex||1731||1758||
|-
||Earl Cowper (1718)||William Clavering-Cowper, 2nd Earl Cowper||1723||1764||
|-
|Earl Stanhope (1718)||Philip Stanhope, 2nd Earl Stanhope||1721||1786||
|-
|Earl Coningsby (1719)||Margaret Newton, 2nd Countess Coningsby||1729||1761||
|-
|Earl of Harborough (1719)||Philip Sherard, 2nd Earl of Harborough||1732||1750||
|-
|Earl of Macclesfield (1721)||George Parker, 2nd Earl of Macclesfield||1732||1764||
|-
|Earl of Pomfret (1721)||Thomas Fermor, 1st Earl of Pomfret||1721||1753||
|-
|Countess of Walsingham (1722)||Melusina von der Schulenburg, Countess of Walsingham||1722||1778||
|-
|Earl Graham of Belford (1722)||William Graham, 1st Earl Graham||1722||1790||Succeeded to the Dukedom of Montrose, see above
|-
|Earl Ker (1722)||Robert Ker, 1st Earl Ker||1722||1790||Succeeded to the Dukedom of Roxburghe, see above
|-
|rowspan=2|Earl Waldegrave (1729)||James Waldegrave, 1st Earl Waldegrave||1729||1741||Died
|-
|James Waldegrave, 2nd Earl Waldegrave||1741||1763||
|-
|Earl of Ashburnham (1730)||John Ashburnham, 2nd Earl of Ashburnham||1737||1812||
|-
|Earl of Wilmington (1730)||Spencer Compton, 1st Earl of Wilmington||1730||1743||Died; Peerage extinct
|-
|Earl FitzWalter (1730)||Benjamin Mildmay, 1st Earl FitzWalter||1730||1756||
|-
|rowspan=2|Earl of Effingham (1731)||Francis Howard, 1st Earl of Effingham||1731||1743||Died
|-
|Thomas Howard, 2nd Earl of Effingham||1743||1763||
|-
|Earl of Malton (1734)||Thomas Watson-Wentworth, 1st Earl of Malton||1734||1750||Created Marquess of Rockingham, see above
|-
|Countess of Yarmouth (1740)||Amalie von Wallmoden, Countess of Yarmouth||1743||1765||New creation
|-
|rowspan=2|Earl of Orford (1742)||Robert Walpole, 1st Earl of Orford||1742||1745||New creation; died
|-
|Robert Walpole, 2nd Earl of Orford||1745||1751||
|-
|Earl of Harrington (1742)||William Stanhope, 1st Earl of Harrington||1742||1756||New creation
|-
|Earl of Bath (1742)||William Pulteney, 1st Earl of Bath||1742||1764||New creation
|-
|Earl of Portsmouth (1743)||John Wallop, 1st Earl of Portsmouth||1743||1762||New creation
|-
|Earl of Leicester (1744)||Thomas Coke, 1st Earl of Leicester||1744||1759||New creation
|-
|Earl Brooke (1746)||Francis Greville, 1st Earl Brooke||1746||1773||New creation
|-
|Earl Clinton (1746)||Hugh Fortescue, 1st Earl Clinton||1746||1751||New creation
|-
|Earl Gower (1746)||John Leveson-Gower, 1st Earl Gower||1746||1754||New creation
|-
|Earl of Buckinghamshire (1746)||John Hobart, 1st Earl of Buckinghamshire||1746||1756||New creation
|-
|Earl Fitzwilliam (1746)||William Fitzwilliam, 1st Earl Fitzwilliam||1746||1756||New creation
|-
|Earl of Powis (1748)||Henry Herbert, 1st Earl of Powis||1748||1772||New creation
|-
|Earl Temple (1749)||Hester Grenville, 1st Countess Temple||1749||1752||New creation
|-
|Earl Harcourt (1749)||Simon Harcourt, 1st Earl Harcourt||1749||1777||New creation
|-
|}

Viscounts

|colspan=5 style="background: #fcc" align="center"|Peerage of England
|-
|rowspan="3"|Viscount Hereford (1550)||Price Devereux, 9th Viscount Hereford||1700||1740||Died
|-
|Price Devereux, 10th Viscount Hereford||1740||1748||Died
|-
|Edward Devereux, 11th Viscount Hereford||1748||1760||
|-
|Viscount Montagu (1554)||Anthony Browne, 6th Viscount Montagu||1717||1767||
|-
|rowspan="2"|Viscount Saye and Sele (1624)||Laurence Fiennes, 5th Viscount Saye and Sele||1710||1742||Died
|-
|Richard Fiennes, 6th Viscount Saye and Sele||1742||1781||
|-
|Viscount Fauconberg (1643)||Thomas Belasyse, 4th Viscount Fauconberg||1718||1774||
|-
|Viscount Hatton (1682)||William Seton Hatton, 2nd Viscount Hatton||1706||1760||
|-
|Viscount Townshend (1682)||Charles Townshend, 3rd Viscount Townshend||1738||1764||
|-
|Viscount Weymouth (1682)||Thomas Thynne, 2nd Viscount Weymouth||1714||1751||
|-
|Viscount Lonsdale (1690)||Henry Lowther, 3rd Viscount Lonsdale||1713||1751||
|-
|colspan=5 style="background: #fcc" align="center"|Peerage of Scotland
|-
|Viscount of Falkland (1620)||Lucius Cary, 7th Viscount Falkland||1730||1785||
|-
|rowspan=2|Viscount of Stormont (1621)||David Murray, 6th Viscount of Stormont||1731||1748||Died
|-
|David Murray, 7th Viscount of Stormont||1748||1796||
|-
|Viscount of Arbuthnott (1641)||John Arbuthnot, 5th Viscount of Arbuthnott||1710||1756||
|-
|Viscount of Irvine (1661)||Henry Ingram, 7th Viscount of Irvine||1736||1761||
|-
|Viscount of Strathallan (1686)||William Drummond, 4th Viscount Strathallan||1711||1746||Attainted
|-
|Viscount of Garnock (1703)||George Lindsay-Crawford, 4th Viscount of Garnock||1738||1808||Succeeded to the Earldom of Crawford, see above
|-
|Viscount of Primrose (1703)||Hugh Primrose, 3rd Viscount of Primrose||1716||1741||Died; Peerage extinct
|-
|colspan=5 style="background: #fcc" align="center"|Peerage of Great Britain
|-
|Viscount Bolingbroke (1712)||Henry St John, 1st Viscount Bolingbroke||1712||1751||
|-
|Viscount Tadcaster (1714)||Henry O'Brien, 1st Viscount Tadcaster||1714||1741||Died; his heir was attained, so the peerages became forfeit
|-
|rowspan=3|Viscount St John (1716)||Henry St John, 1st Viscount St John||1716||1742||Died
|-
|John St John, 2nd Viscount St John||1716||1748||Died
|-
|Frederick  St John, 3rd Viscount St John||1748||1787||
|-
|rowspan=2|Viscount Cobham (1718)||Richard Temple, 1st Viscount Cobham||1718||1749||Died
|-
|Hester Grenville, 2nd Viscountess Cobham||1749||1752||
|-
|Viscount Falmouth (1720)||Hugh Boscawen, 2nd Viscount Falmouth||1734||1782||
|-
|Viscount Lymington (1720)||John Wallop, 1st Viscount Lymington||1720||1762||Created Earl of Portsmouth, see above
|-
|rowspan=2|Viscount Torrington (1721)||Pattee Byng, 2nd Viscount Torrington||1733||1747||Died
|-
|George Byng, 3rd Viscount Torrington||1747||1750||
|-
|Viscount Harcourt (1721)||Simon Harcourt, 2nd Viscount Harcourt||1727||1777||Created Earl Harcourt, see above
|-
|Viscount Leinster (1747)||James FitzGerald, 1st Viscount Leinster||1747||1773||New creation; Earl of Kildare in the Peerage of Ireland
|-
|Viscount Folkestone (1747)||Jacob Bouverie, 1st Viscount Folkestone||1747||1761||New creation
|-
|}

Barons

|colspan=5 style="background: #fcc" align="center"|Peerage of England
|-
|Baron Clinton (1299)||Hugh Fortescue, 14th Baron Clinton||1721||1751||Created Earl Clinton, see above
|- 
|rowspan="2"|Baron Ferrers of Chartley (1299)||Elizabeth Compton, 15th Baroness Ferrers of Chartley||1717||1741||Died, barony fell into abeyance
|- 
|Charlotte Townshend, 16th Baroness Ferrers of Chartley||1749||1770||Abeyance terminated
|- 
|Baron de Clifford (1299)||Margaret Coke, 19th Baroness de Clifford||1734||1775||
|- 
|Baron Dacre (1321)||Anne Barrett-Lennard, 16th Baroness Dacre||1741||1755||Abeyance terminated
|- 
|rowspan="2"|Baron Dudley (1440)||William Ward, 10th Baron Dudley||1731||1740||Died
|- 
|Ferdinando Dudley Lea, 11th Baron Dudley||1740||1757||
|- 
|rowspan=2|Baron Stourton (1448)||Thomas Stourton, 14th Baron Stourton||1720||1744||Died
|- 
|Charles Stourton, 15th Baron Stourton||1744||1753||
|- 
|Baron Berners (1455)||Katherine Bokenham, 8th Baroness Berners||1711||1743||Died, Barony fell into abeyance
|- 
|Baron Willoughby de Broke (1491)||Richard Verney, 13th Baron Willoughby de Broke||1728||1752||
|- 
|rowspan="2"|Baron Wentworth (1529)||Martha Johnson, 8th Baroness Wentworth||1697||1745||Died
|-
|Edward Noel, 9th Baron Wentworth||1745||1774||
|-
|Baron Wharton (1544)||Jane Wharton, 7th Baroness Wharton||1739||1761||
|-
|Baron Willoughby of Parham (1547)||Hugh Willoughby, 15th Baron Willoughby of Parham||1715||1765||
|-
|Baron North (1554)||Francis North, 7th Baron North||1734||1790||
|-
|Baron Hunsdon (1559)||William Ferdinand Carey, 8th Baron Hunsdon||1702||1765||
|-
|Baron St John of Bletso (1559)||John St John, 11th Baron St John of Bletso||1722||1757||
|-
|Baron De La Warr (1570)||John West, 7th Baron De La Warr||1723||1766||
|-
|rowspan="2"|Baron Petre (1603)||Robert Petre, 8th Baron Petre||1713||1742||Died
|-
|Robert Petre, 9th Baron Petre||1742||1801||
|-
|rowspan="2"|Baron Arundell of Wardour (1605)||Henry Arundell, 6th Baron Arundell of Wardour||1726||1746||Died
|-
|Henry Arundell, 7th Baron Arundell of Wardour||1746||1756||
|-
|Baron Dormer (1615)||Charles Dormer, 6th Baron Dormer||1728||1761||
|-
|Baron Teynham (1616)||Henry Roper, 10th Baron Teynham||1727||1781||
|-
|Baron Brooke (1621)||Francis Greville, 8th Baron Brooke||1727||1773||Created Earl Brooke, see above
|-
|Baron Craven (1627)||Fulwar Craven, 4th Baron Craven||1739||1764||
|-
|rowspan="3"|Baron Maynard (1628)||Henry Maynard, 4th Baron Maynard||1718||1742||Died
|-
|Grey Maynard, 5th Baron Maynard||1742||1745||Died
|-
|Charles Maynard, 6th Baron Maynard||1745||1775||
|-
|rowspan="2"|Baron Leigh (1643)||Thomas Leigh, 4th Baron Leigh||1738||1749||Died
|-
|Edward Leigh, 5th Baron Leigh||1749||1786||
|-
|Baron Byron (1643)||William Byron, 5th Baron Byron||1736||1798||
|-
|Baron Ward (1644)||John Ward, 6th Baron Ward||1740||1774||Title previously held by Barons Dudley
|-
|Baron Langdale (1658)||Marmaduke Langdale, 4th Baron Langdale||1718||1771||
|-
|rowspan="2"|Baron Berkeley of Stratton (1658)||William Berkeley, 4th Baron Berkeley of Stratton||1697||1741||Died
|-
|John Berkeley, 5th Baron Berkeley of Stratton||1741||1773||
|-
|Baron Cornwallis (1661)||Charles Cornwallis, 5th Baron Cornwallis||1722||1762||
|-
|Baron Arundell of Trerice (1664)||John Arundell, 4th Baron Arundell of Trerice||1706||1768||
|-
|Baron Clifford of Chudleigh (1672)||Hugh Clifford, 4th Baron Clifford of Chudleigh||1732||1783||
|-
|Baron Willoughby of Parham (1680)||Hugh Willoughby, 15th Baron Willoughby of Parham||1715||1765||
|-
|Baron Carteret (1681)||John Carteret, 2nd Baron Carteret||1695||1763||
|-
|rowspan="2"|Baron Stawell (1683)||William Stawell, 3rd Baron Stawell||1692||1742||Died
|-
|Edward Stawell, 4th Baron Stawell||1742||1755||
|-
|Baron Guilford (1683)||Francis North, 3rd Baron Guilford||1729||1790||
|-
|Baron Griffin (1688)||Edward Griffin, 3rd Baron Griffin||1715||1742||Died, title extinct
|-
|Baron Haversham (1696)||Maurice Thompson, 2nd Baron Haversham||1710||1745||Died, title extinct
|-
|Baron Barnard (1698)||Gilbert Vane, 2nd Baron Barnard||1723||1753||
|-
|Baron Gower (1703)||John Leveson-Gower, 2nd Baron Gower||1709||1754||Created Earl Gower, see above
|-
|Baron Conway (1703)||Francis Seymour-Conway, 2nd Baron Conway||1732||1794||
|-
|colspan=5 style="background: #fcc" align="center"|Peerage of Scotland
|-
|Lord Somerville (1430)||James Somerville, 13th Lord Somerville||1709||1765||
|-
|Lord Forbes (1442)||James Forbes, 15th Lord Forbes||1734||1761||
|-
|rowspan=2|Lord Saltoun (1445)||Alexander Fraser, 13th Lord Saltoun||1715||1748||Died
|-
|Alexander Fraser, 14th Lord Saltoun||1748||1751||
|-
|Lord Gray (1445)||John Gray, 11th Lord Gray||1738||1782||
|-
|Lord Oliphant (1455)||Francis Oliphant, 10th Lord Oliphant||1721||1748||Died, title extinct
|-
|rowspan=2|Lord Cathcart (1460)||Charles Cathcart, 8th Lord Cathcart||1732||1740||Died
|-
|Charles Cathcart, 9th Lord Cathcart||1740||1776||
|-
|Lord Lovat (1464)||Simon Fraser, 11th Lord Lovat||1699||1746||Peerage forfeited 
|-
|rowspan=2|Lord Sempill (1489)||Hugh Sempill, 12th Lord Sempill||1727||1746||Died
|-
|John Sempill, 13th Lord Sempill||1746||1782||
|-
|Lord Ross (1499)||George Ross, 13th Lord Ross||1738||1754||
|-
|Lord Elphinstone (1509)||Charles Elphinstone, 9th Lord Elphinstone||1718||1757||
|-
|Lord Torphichen (1564)||James Sandilands, 7th Lord Torphichen||1696||1753||
|-
|Lord Lindores (1600)||Alexander Leslie, 6th Lord Lindores||1719||1765||
|-
|rowspan=2|Lord Colville of Culross (1604)||John Colville, 6th Lord Colville of Culross||1717||1741||Died
|-
|Alexander Colville, 7th Lord Colville of Culross||1741||1770||
|-
|rowspan=2|Lord Balmerinoch (1606)||John Elphinstone, 5th Lord Balmerino||1736||1746||Died
|-
|Arthur Elphinstone, 6th Lord Balmerino||1746||1746||Peerage forfeited
|-
|rowspan=2|Lord Blantyre (1606)||Robert Stuart, 7th Lord Blantyre||1713||1743||Died
|-
|Walter Stuart, 8th Lord Blantyre||1743||1751||
|-
|Lord Cranstoun (1609)||James Cranstoun, 6th Lord Cranstoun||1727||1773||
|-
|rowspan=2|Lord Aston of Forfar (1627)||Walter Aston, 4th Lord Aston of Forfar||1714||1748||Died
|-
|James Aston, 5th Lord Aston of Forfar||1748||1751||
|-
|Lord Fairfax of Cameron (1627)||Thomas Fairfax, 6th Lord Fairfax of Cameron||1710||1781||
|-
|Lord Napier (1627)||Francis Napier, 6th Lord Napier||1706||1773||
|-
|rowspan=2|Lord Reay (1628)||George Mackay, 3rd Lord Reay||1681||1748||Died
|-
|Donald Mackay, 4th Lord Reay||1748||1761||
|-
|Lord Forbes of Pitsligo (1633)||Alexander Forbes, 4th Lord Forbes of Pitsligo||1690||1746||Attainted; Peerage forfeited
|-
|Lord Kirkcudbright (1633)||William Maclellan, 7th Lord Kirkcudbright||1730||1762||
|-
|rowspan=2|Lord Forrester (1633)||George Forrester, 6th Lord Forrester||1727||1748||Died
|-
|William Forrester, 7th Lord Forrester||1748||1763||
|-
|rowspan=2|Lord Banff (1642)||Alexander Ogilvy, 6th Lord Banff||1738||1746||Died
|-
|Alexander Ogilvy, 7th Lord Banff||1746||1771||
|-
|Lord Elibank (1643)||Patrick Murray, 5th Lord Elibank||1736||1778||
|-
|Lord Falconer of Halkerton (1646)||David Falconer, 4th Lord Falconer of Halkerton||1724||1751||
|-
|Lord Belhaven and Stenton (1647)||John Hamilton, 4th Lord Belhaven and Stenton||1721||1764||
|-
|Lord Rollo (1651)||Robert Rollo, 4th Lord Rollo||1700||1758||
|-
|Lord Ruthven of Freeland (1650)||Isobel Ruthven, 4th Lady Ruthven of Freeland||1722||1783||
|-
|rowspan=2|Lord Bellenden (1661)||John Bellenden, 3rd Lord Bellenden||1707||1741||Died
|-
|Ker Bellenden, 4th Lord Bellenden||1741||1753||
|-
|Lord Kinnaird (1682)||Charles Kinnaird, 5th Lord Kinnaird||1727||1758||
|-
|}

References

 

1740
1740s in England
1740s in Ireland
1740s in Scotland
Peers
Peers
Peers
Peers
Peers
Peers
18th-century nobility